General elections were held in Islamabad Capital Territory on Wednesday, 7 March 1977 to elect 1 member of National Assembly of Pakistan from Islamabad.

Pakistan People's Party won Islamabad seat.

Candidates 
Total no of 3 Candidates including 1 Independent contested for 1 National Assembly Seat from Islamabad.

Result 

Party Wise

Constituency wise

References

1977 elections in Pakistan
General elections in Pakistan